() is a song by Japanese band Sakanaction. It was released as a digital download on November 12, 2008, and on December 10 was released as the band's first physical CD single.

Background and development 

Shin-shiro was the band's first album after joining the main Victor Entertainment roster and signing a contract with management group Hipland Management. In Spring 2009, the band moved to Tokyo from Hokkaido. The album was primarily created by band members in vocalist Ichiro Yamaguchi's apartment in Kawasaki, Kanagawa.

Before the band had moved to Tokyo in the spring of 2009, the song "Adventure" was originally planned to be the leading single from the album, in the place of "Sen to Rei". "Adventure" was written by Yamaguchi to consciously give the band a more accessible sound. Yamaguchi had intended to make music that blended underground and "high entertainment" pop music sounds on the band's first two studio albums, Go to the Future (2007) and Night Fishing (2008), however found that the band was predominantly seen as more underground than pop. Yamaguchi realized that in order to balance underground and "entertainment"-based pop music styles better, he needed to add more entertaining aspects. Yamaguchi considered "Adventure" the first step towards this sound, and challenged themselves to develop their popular sound more in "Sen to Rei". "Sen to Rei" became crucial to the creation of Shin-shiro, as the band created the entire album in response to the song, considering what aspects of Sakanaction's sound should listeners who had heard "Sen to Rei" hear, in order to experience all of Sakanction.

The single was the group's final release with BabeStar Label, before they moved onto Victor Entertainment's main roster. It was also the start of their relationship with stylist Hisashi "Momo" Kitazawa.

Composition 

"Sen to Rei" is a song recorded in common time, with a major key of E and set at a tempo of 132 beats per minute. It begins with an instrumental introduction, including guitars, bass guitars, keyboards and drums, with a strong "guitar rock" sound mixes with synthesizers. The verses begin with a chord progression of Cm-A-Am-E, while the chorus begins with an Am-Emaj7-Gm-E-A progression.

The song's lyrics are written entirely in Japanese. The song's protagonist walks around at night-time, jet lagged after a night flight and "escaping the saddening night". He discovers he can see an "intertwined world" after counting to 1,000 on his hand. The final stanza of the lyrics discusses spatial dimensions: how "on the other side of 1000 and 0, and lines and points" he is a layered world, connecting him to another person.

Writing and production 

"Sen to Rei" was composed by Yamaguchi on the acoustic guitar, and was originally a much more sad and sentimental song. For Shin-shiro'''s album sessions, vocalist Yamaguchi tried a different approach to creating songs: after making the basic melody and lyrics, he assigned each of the members of Sakanction to a create a demo for one song each, and then developed the songs together. Kusakari was working on "Sen to Rei", and was the fastest to finish her demo, and the only member to bring a fully completed demo to her meeting with Yamaguchi. Yamaguchi asked Kusakari to make a "guitar rock"-style song, and asked her to make a song that teenagers would enjoy listening to.

The demo that Kusakari produced was much more rock than Yamaguchi had intended, as Yamaguchi had wanted to balance pop music with Sakanaction's underground dance sound. Eventually the band created a hybrid sound for the song, mixing guitar-based rock and electronica. The process of creating a guitar-based rock song reminded Kusakari of her teenager years before joining Sakanaction, when she performed in rock and punk bands in Sapporo. One of the techniques used by the band to make the song more pop was to increase the tempo to 138 BPM. Yamaguchi initially felt embarrassed that the band were able to create such a pop song, however after the song's release found that the band's audience responded well to the style, the band integrated the pop style found on "Sen to Rei" into the band's music, eventually becoming a central part of Sakanaction's musical identity.

Yamaguchi's lyrics for the song were inspired by space and space in the style of the manga Galaxy Express 999. He based his lyrics on his ideas of what four-dimensional space would be like, considering the fourth dimension to be imagination running inside minds. The use of a large number and a number used to represent nothingness in the title "Sen to Rei" was meant to express the relative difference between each spatial dimension: changing from a single point, to a line, to a 3D object.

Originally the band did not intend to release "Sen to Rei" as a physical single, but during its production they realized that the song was more appropriate to be released as a single, rather than simply as an album track. The band created the three tracks on the physical single to complement each other, in the style of an extended play more so than a stand-alone single track with B-sides. While "Sen to Rei" was written attempting to bridge popular and underground sounds, "Ame (A)" was written as a straightforward pop song, and "Modokashii Hibi" as an underground song. "Ame (A)" was an attempt by the band to create a "pop Sakanaction" sound, where Yamaguchi attempted to create story-like lyrics, and the band worked on a 1970s kayōkyoku-inspired retro sound. "Modokashii Hibi" featured aspects of the band's sound that were not present in "Sen to Rei" that they wanted to show off to new listeners. The recording features the sound of a metal bucket that Yamaguchi purchased. Part way through recording, the bucket's handle broke off, and this sound as well as Iwadera laughing were included in the final mix of the song.

 Promotion and release 

The song was first unveiled during the band's festival performance at the Rising Sun Rock Festival in Otaru on August 16, 2008. The song was promoted on the Toyama Television program BBT Music Selection as its opening theme music, and was put into heavy rotation by the Nippon TV music program Music Fighter. The song was put into heavy rotation by music stations across Japan in December, and the music video in heavy rotation by MTV Japan. Sakanaction made radio appearances in December, on FM Osaka, FM802, FM Hokkaido and FM North Wave, and were featured in the November and December issues of the magazines B-Pass, Nikkei Entertainment!, Kansai Walker, Musica and Rockin' On Japan.

Following the theme of naming the live concert after the song title, Sen Live had an entry fee of 1,000 yen, while Rei Live was free for entrants who applied with a form attached to the "Sen to Rei" single.

The song is a frequent part of Sakanaction's live concert sets, and live recordings of the song have been released by the band six times: in the bonus track on the "Aruku Around" (2010) single featuring audio of three songs from the Sakanaquarium 2009 concert in Sapporo, twice on their Sanakaquarium 2010 DVD set, as performed at the Kikuuiki tour final at the Shinkiba Studio Coast on May 15, 2010 and at their Nippon Budokan concert on October 8, 2010, as well as on their Sakanaquarium 2011 video album, Sakanaquarium 2012 "Zepp Alive" digital live album and their Sakanatribe 2014 video album releases.

The song was compiled as the opening track on Getting Better 15th Anniversary presents Getting Roll: Rock Anthem Mix, a CD mixed by rock DJ Minoru Katahira celebrating fifteen years of the Getting Better rock event. Both "Ame (A)" and "Modokashii Hibi" were compiled on the Tsuki no Namigata disc of the band's compilation album Natsukashii Tsuki wa Atarashii Tsuki: Coupling & Remix Works (2015).

 Music video 

The music video for the song was directed by Keitaro Toyoda. It features all five members of Sakanaction performing the song in the dark. This is followed by scenes of the camera moving towards a bright light source, with the band members juxtaposed onto the beams. Toyoda was inspired to create the video after hearing of the song's themes, and depicted the band travelling from the first to the fourth dimension. Yamaguchi asked Toyoda to specifically emphasize the rock and human aspects of the song and the band, rather than the electronic sound.

 Critical reception 

Sakiko Okazaki of Rockin' On Japan praised the song's high-pitched synthesizers, fast-paced guitars, groovy bass and heart-hitting drums, and felt the song expressed the vigor of Sakanaction. CDJournal reviewers felt "Sen to Rei" expressed loneliness, and praised the new Sakanaction-style guitar rock, as well as their ever-changing style. The reviewers were impressed with Yamaguchi's chorus vocals, which changed from "subtle and tender to hopeful and empowered", and called the song a "fast-paced killer tune". They noted that the song was not very "showy", however felt that despite this, Sakanaction still expressed a "high quality hybrid" sound. Kuniko Yamada of Bounce praised the song's "sprinting feeling", and noted how Sakanaction were comfortable with creating more standard "guitar rock" songs as well. Entertainment Media Kulture named "Sample" as one of Sakanaction's early signature songs, feeling that the uptempo song positively worked against Sakanaction's prior image as a band.

Reviewing the single as a whole, Okazaki described the B-sides as having "room temperature dance beats", and felt that they sounded fresh, in comparison to the highly powered "Sen to Rei".

 Track listings 

Personnel

Personnel details for the song were sourced from Shin-shiros liner notes booklet, while music video personnel were sourced from Sakanarchive 2007—2011: Sakanaction Music Video Collection.SakanactionAll members – arrangement, production
Keiichi Ejima – drums
Motoharu Iwadera – guitar
Ami Kusakari – bass guitar
Emi Okazaki – keyboards
Ichiro Yamaguchi – vocals, guitar, lyrics, compositionPersonnelToshihiko Fujimi – executive producer
Kentaro Ishikawa – A&R
Satoshi Kamata – executive producer
Tatsuya Nomura – executive producer (Hip Land Music Corporation)
Masashi Uramoto – mixing, recording
Wataru Woka – A&RMusic video personnel'''

Cromagnon – production company
Kenji Ishida – hair, make-up
Hisashi "Momo" Kitazawa – stylist
Masaya Nakahara – cameraman
Sakanaction – cast
Takashi Sugai – producer
Keitarō Toyoda – director
Kazuhiro Yokobori – lighting

Chart rankings

Sales and certifications

Release history

References 

2008 singles
2008 songs
Japanese-language songs
Sakanaction songs
Songs written by Ichiro Yamaguchi
Victor Entertainment singles